The Interstate Highways in South Dakota are the segments of the Dwight D. Eisenhower National System of Interstate and Defense Highways owned and maintained by the South Dakota Department of Transportation in the US state of South Dakota.


Mainline highways

Business routes

See also

References

External links

 
Interstate